Lovespell is a 1981 fantasy romantic tragedy film featuring Richard Burton as King Mark of Cornwall. It was directed by Tom Donovan. It is based on the classic saga of Tristan and Isolde.

Production

Filmed in Ireland in 1979 as Tristan and Isolde this film was eventually released for limited screenings in theaters in 1981 as Lovespell.

Harry Hamlin auditioned for the film as well as Clash of the Titans opting to do the latter so he could work with Laurence Olivier. Nicholas Clay also read for the role of Perseus in Clash of the Titans but when Hamlin got the role, Clay ended up as Tristan in Lovespell.

Plot 

Lovespell is based around a love triangle between King Mark of Cornwall (Richard Burton), Isolt (Kate Mulgrew), and Tristan (Nicholas Clay). Mark discovers Isolt's love for Tristan, and banishes Tristan. However, while being away, Tristan is mortally wounded. Isolt persuades Mark to go and take Tristan back to Cornwall. Mark says if he returns casting white sails Tristan is alive and if they are black Tristan is dead. Mark returns with Tristan barely alive with white sails, but casts black sails when Tristan reveals his plans to run away with Isolt as soon as he has recovered. This causes Isolt to kill herself by throwing herself off the White Cliffs of Dover. Mark helps Tristan swim to the shore, and as Tristan and Isolt's hands touch they both die, while Mark, knee deep in the water, looks on.

Cast 
 Richard Burton as King Mark of Cornwall
 Kate Mulgrew as Isolt
 Nicholas Clay as Tristan
 Cyril Cusack as Gormond of Ireland
 Geraldine Fitzgerald as Bronwyn
 Niall Toibin as Andred
 Diana Van der Vlis as Alix
 Niall O'Brien as Corvenal
 Kathryn Dowling as Yseult of the White Hand
 John Jo Brooks as Father Colm
 Trudy Hayes as Anne
 John Scanlon as Bishop
 Bobby Johnson as William the Guard
 John Labine as Eoghanin

References

External links

 
 

1981 films
Films set in the 6th century
Films set in Cornwall
Films set in Kent
Arthurian films
1980s English-language films